Frank Potts may refer to:
 Frank Potts (coach)
 Frank Potts (winemaker)
 Frank L. Potts, Canadian politician